Moben may refer to:
 Maurice Benayoun, contemporary new media artist (aka MoBen or Mo Ben. In Chinese：莫奔, that could be translated by: the one who "doesn't run")
 Moben Kitchens, a defunct kitchen fittings and design retailer